Mission El Descanso, originally Misión San Miguel la Nueva, was a Spanish mission located in what is now Playas de Rosarito Municipality, Baja California. It was the founded by the Dominican missionary Tomás de Ahumada in 1810 in an area long inhabited by the Kumeyaay people. 

The mission was the penultimate Dominican mission to be founded and the only mission to be founded in what was then the short-lived Spanish province of Baja California. It is also the northernmost mission in what is now Mexico. Today, only stone foundations and ruined adobe walls survive.

History 

Due to the frequent flooding of Mission San Miguel by the Río Guadalupe, missionary Tomás de Ahumada sought another site located on higher ground. Additional advantages of the site included the northerly location closer to the Presidio of San Diego, as well as the farming and grazing potential of the river valley below.

In 1810, Misión San Miguel la Nueva was established.

From here, both mission sites were managed in a cooperatively and collectively referred to as Mission El Descanso.

In 1834, following the Decree for the Secularization of the Missions of California, Mission El Descanso ceased to function. At the time it had a population of just 254, including those from Mission San Miguel. By 1853, the mission was deserted and fell into ruin.

Mission complex 
The church, the sacristy, and the missionary rooms were the main structures and formed a square. Several kilometers upstream there was a garden, a winery, and orchards. The irrigation system, which used a reservoir and gravity to take the water in acequias into the fields, was typical for missions of this sort. Protection may have been provided by a small fort, located on a hill to the south where the old cemetery is located.

Due to its proximity to the Pacific Ocean, El Descanso had been involved in a maritime commerce with ships that traveled along its shores in search of merchandise such as otter fur, salt, tallow, vegetables, and grain.

Construction 

The buildings were made of adobe, with round foundations set at a depth of 80 centimeters and cemented with a mortar of clay, sand, and lime.

The adobe bricks resting on the foundation were cemented with the same mixture and placed in an alternating fashion to give the walls more strength and stability. The walls were from 0.90-1.10 meters thick. The adobe was made with local soil, water, clay, and sand; unlike the other missionary complexes of the area, these were mixed with pebbles and crushed shells instead of the usual straw, to make the material tougher.

The roofs were interlaced with rush branches over oak beams, and the floors were made of adobe tile.

Location and natural habitat 
The ruins of this mission are situated in El Descanso Valley, on the banks of an arroyo of the same name, which ends in a small estuary. In front of this are large coastal dunes formed by strong winds from the sea that have blown the sand there.

The missionaries discovered a mild, humid climate and fertile land in this region, with the characteristic vegetation of coastal shrubs such as rush, watercress, purslane, cattail, mustard, mangrove, grease wood, coastal live oaks, manzanita, yucca, honey mesquite, red willow, cholla, and goat nut.

Animals that inhabited the region included red fox, badger, skunk, coyote, deer, cougar, bobcat, hare, rabbit, squirrel, California quail, rattlesnake, several water snakes, and lizards.

Since the sea was nearby, the sea provided other sources of food, including lobster, abalone, clam, mussel, octopus, sea bass, tuna, small sharks, rays, and sardine.

The agricultural production was favored by the humid climate, allowing the cultivation of wheat, barley, and corn, as well as a diversity of fruits and vegetables.

The orchard and vineyard were located in the eastern portion of the valley. Animals kept included cattle, sheep, goats, horses, and mules.

Conservation 

Of the original mission complex, only the foundations, small portions of the mission walls, and an outbuilding remain. Efforts to preserve and study the remaining traces of Mission El Descanso have been implemented under the auspices of Mexico's National Institute of Anthropology and History (INAH). A provisional metal covering was installed to protect the remaining adobe tile floors, adobe walls, and foundations from the elements. Exploratory archaeological excavations were also made at the site in 1997.

El Descanso Church

El Descanso Church, officially the Iglesia de San Miguel Arcángel, a new Mission Revival Style Church, was built on the site of the 1830 Dominican Misión El Descanso, south of the present-day city of Rosarito, Baja California.

See also

 Spanish missions in Baja California
 Spanish missions in California
 Mission San Diego de Alcalá
 Misión Guadalupe del Norte - the final Dominican mission to be founded, 1834
 Mission San Francisco Solano - the final Franciscan mission to be founded, 1824

References

Additional citations
 Meigs, Peveril, III. 1935. The Dominican Mission Frontier of Lower California. University of California Publications in Geography No. 7. Berkeley.
 Vernon, Edward W. 2002. Las Misiones Antiguas: The Spanish Missions of Baja California, 1683-1855. Viejo Press, Santa Barbara, California.
 Kier, David. 2016. Baja California Land of Missions
M&E BOOKS, El Cajon, California.

Descanso
Playas de Rosarito Municipality
1817 establishments in New Spain